Skarp is a grindcore band from Seattle, Washington, United States. The band has released one split EP with Human Error, one EP, and two full-length studio albums. The band has been heavily influenced by Choking Victim.

History
The band was formed by former David Koresh Choir members Renae and Robert in 1999, and they were soon joined by Brent McKnight of Act of Heresy on bass and Eric Brose of Crisis Rebirth on drums. Brose was soon replaced by Joe Axler on drums, with Brose moving to second guitar. The line-up stabilized when McKnight left to concentrate on the November Group, with Brose leaving soon after. Skarp continued as a three-piece for six months, Tim Lewis joined on bass, and this line-up played on the band's first release. When Tim was injured, Andrew Kress joined to replace him.

The band have released two albums, the first Bury Your Dead in 2004, subsequently signing to Alternative Tentacles after touring Europe in support of The Melvins, and releasing the Billy Anderson-produced Requiem in late 2005.

Drummer Joe Axler is also a member of Portland-based Splatterhouse and played on Book of Black Earth's 2006 album The Feast.

Musical style
The band have labelled their style "blackout grind", combining elements of hardcore punk, crust punk, grindcore, and metal.

Members
Renae Betts - vocals
Robert Daniels - guitar
Andrew Kress - bass guitar
Joe Axler - drums

Former members
Brent McKnight - bass guitar
Eric Brose - drums
Tim Lewis- bass guitar

Discography

Studio albums
Bury Your Dead (2004), Inimical
Requiem (2005), Alternative Tentacles

EPs
Split EP with Human Error (2001)
Skarp EP (2003)

References

Punk rock groups from Washington (state)
Musical groups from Seattle
Alternative Tentacles artists
American crust and d-beat groups